Hafiz Mehmed Pasha was the Ottoman wali (governor) of the Kosovo Vilayet between 1894 and 1899. He had previously served as mutesarif of Pristina.

References

Governors of the Ottoman Empire
Kosovo vilayet
19th-century Ottoman military personnel